Carol Hudson may refer to:

Carol Hudson, character in Vice Raid
Carole Hudson, character in Glee